Route 59 is a highway in southwest Missouri running from Interstate 44/Interstate 49/U.S. Route 71 at Fidelity to the Arkansas state line where it continues as Highway 59.  It replaced a large section of U.S. Route 71 and Alternate US 71 in sections.  The first section was designated in 1960 between Lanagan and the Arkansas state line when US 71 was moved down the former Route 88.  In the 1990s, US 71 was moved and upgraded to interstate standards from Neosho to Lanagan and Route 59 was extended north to Neosho.  When US 71 was moved east of Joplin in the late 1990s, Alternate US 71 was deleted, and Route 59 was extended north to replace that highway.  The highway was numbered after Arkansas Highway 59.

Route description
Route 59 is a two-lane highway for its entire length except for a short section in southern Neosho where it forms a concurrency with Business I-49.

The highway begins at the Arkansas state line where it is continued from Arkansas Highway 59. The road runs under some of the bluffs along the Elk River (with signs warning of low clearance for trucks). It also runs into a very scenic area, squeezed between steep bluffs and the railroad then passes through Noel and briefly has a concurrency with Route 90 then curves east where it runs next to the Kansas City Southern Railway for several miles then passes through Anderson. At Anderson, there is a short concurrency with Route 76 then has a concurrency with Business US 71 and turning into a windy road until it intersects with I-49 at a partial interchange. 

Then, it leaves McDonald County before passing through Goodman. In Neosho, Route 59 picks ups a concurrency with U.S. Route 60 and then picks up Route 86 for a brief moment. There is an interchange with the northern junction with U.S. Route 60 northeast of Neosho where US 60 concurrency ends. The road remains two-lane (US 60 is also two-lane here) for the interchange, which was built due to numerous accidents at the former intersection. Next, Route 59 passes through Diamond. Finally, the highway ends at I-44/I-49/US 71 at a cloverleaf interchange in Fidelity where the road continues north as I-49/US 71 heading towards Kansas City.

Major intersections

References

059
U.S. Route 71
Transportation in Jasper County, Missouri